The following highways are numbered 361:

Canada
 Newfoundland and Labrador Route 361
 Quebec Route 361
 Saskatchewan Highway 361

India
 National Highway 361 (India)

Japan
 Japan National Route 361

United States 
  Arkansas Highway 361
  Connecticut Route 361
  Georgia State Route 361 (former)
  Hawaii Route 361
  Maryland Route 361
  Minnesota State Highway 361
  Nevada State Route 361
  New York State Route 361 (former)
  Ohio State Route 361
  Oregon Route 361 (former)
  Puerto Rico Highway 361
 Texas:
  Texas State Highway 361
  Farm to Market Road 361
  Virginia State Route 361